Abdullah Ateq is a Saudi Arabian actor born in 1990. He started his work in the media field as a presenter and move on to an acting career in 2011. He is known for his various roles in the TV series No Big Deal (Arabic: أي خدمة).

Awards
Abdullah Ateq was awarded by Rotana khalijia in 2015 for diverse roles in acting.

References

Saudi Arabian film actors
People from Riyadh
1990 births
Living people